Nehran (also Romanized as Nehrān, Nahrān, and Nakhran) is a village in Khandan Rural District, Tarom Sofla District, Qazvin County, Qazvin Province, Iran. At the 2006 census, its population was 100, in 31 families.

References 

Populated places in Qazvin County